Gustaf Adolf Boltenstern (1 April 1861 – 9 October 1935) was a Swedish officer and horse rider.

Early life
Boltenstern was born on 1 April 1861 in Helsingborg, Sweden, the son of major Gösta Boltenstern and his wife Charlotte von Boltenstern.

Career

Military career
Boltenstern was commissioned as an officer in 1892 and was assigned with the rank of underlöjtnant to the Life Guards of Horse in 1882. He attended the royal riding school in Vienna, Austria from 1884 to 1885 and served as a stablemaster at the Swedish Army Riding and Horse-Driving School at Strömsholm Palace from 1896 to 1899. Boltenstern was promoted to ryttmästare in 1898 and to major in 1908. He was then head of the Swedish Army Riding and Horse-Driving School from 1908 to 1912 when he was promoted to lieutenant colonel in the Life Regiment Hussars. He was promoted to colonel in 1915 and was appointed executive commander of the Life Regiment Dragoons, serving until 1921.

Sports career
Boltenstern competed in the individual dressage at the 1912 and  1920 Summer Olympics. He won a silver medal in 1912 with his horse Neptun, but eight years later he and his horse Iron were disqualified.

Personal life
In 1889, Boltenstern married Amelie von Dardel (1866–1919), the daughter of cabinet chamberlain Fritz von Dardel and Baroness Augusta Silfverschiöld.

His son Gustaf Adolf Boltenstern, Jr. won four Olympic medals in dressage in 1948–1956.

Dates of rank
1882 – Underlöjtnant
18?? – Lieutenant
1898 – Ryttmästare
1908 – Major
1912 – Lieutenant colonel
1915 – Colonel

References

1861 births
1935 deaths
Swedish dressage riders
Olympic equestrians of Sweden
Swedish male equestrians
Equestrians at the 1912 Summer Olympics
Equestrians at the 1920 Summer Olympics
Olympic silver medalists for Sweden
Olympic medalists in equestrian
Sportspeople from Helsingborg
Swedish Army colonels
Medalists at the 1912 Summer Olympics